Qızılarx is a village in the municipality of Çələbixan in the Shaki Rayon of Azerbaijan.

References

Populated places in Shaki District